Iroquois is a village in Concord Township, Iroquois County, Illinois, United States, along the Iroquois River. As of the 2010 census the population was 154, down from 207 at the 2000 census.

Geography
Iroquois is located in eastern Iroquois County at 40°49'40" North, 87°35'1" West (40.827880, -87.583591). It sits on the north side of the Iroquois River, a west-flowing tributary of the Kankakee River and part of the Illinois River watershed.

U.S. Route 52 passes through the village, leading south  to Sheldon and northwest the same distance to Donovan.

Demographics

In the census of 2000, there were 207 people, 84 households, and 65 families in the village. The racial makeup was 98.55% White, 0% African American, 0% Native American, 0.48% Asian, 0% Pacific Islander, 0.00% from other races, and 0.97% from two or more races.  0% of the population were Hispanic or Latino of any race.

There were 84 households, out of which 32.1% had children under18 living with them, 65.5% were married couples living together, 6.0% had a female householder with no husband present, and 22.6% were non-families. 21.4% of all households were made up of individuals, and 8.3% had someone living alone who was 65 or older.  The average household size was 2.46 and the average family size 2.83.

In the village, the population was 24.2% under 18, 7.7% from 18 to 24, 27.5% from 25 to 44, 25.6% from 45 to 64, and 15.0% who were 65 or older.  The median age was 40. For every 100 females there were 95.3 males. For every 100 females 18 and over, there were 101.3 males.

The median income for a household was $35,781, and the median income for a family $40,250. Males had a median income of $31,875 versus $23,438 for females. The per capita income for the village was $16,624.  1.6% of the population and 0.0% of families were below the poverty line.   0% of those under 18 and 3.4% of those 65 and older were below the poverty line.

References

Villages in Iroquois County, Illinois